Viviré otra vez ("I Shall Live Again") is a 1940 Mexican film, directed by Roberto Rodríguez and starring Adriana Lamar, Alicia de Phillips and David Silva.

External links
 

1940 films
1940s Spanish-language films
1940 comedy films
Mexican black-and-white films
Mexican comedy films
1940s Mexican films